Yacine is the French version of the Arabic name Yasin. It is common in North Africa.) is a surname and unisex given name of Arabic origin. The name comes from a chapter (surah) of the Quran called Ya-Sin. It is an epithet of the prophet Muhammad.

Notable persons

Given name
Yacine Abdessadki (born 1981), French-born Moroccan football midfielder
Yacine Akhnouche, joint citizen of France and Algeria who confessed to having ties to Al Qaeda
Yacine Amaouche (born 1979), Algerian footballer
Yacine Benalia, Algerian-born Islamist militant, allegedly participated in the Beslan school hostage crisis in 2004
Yacine Bentaala (born 1955), former Algerian international who played as a goalkeeper
Yacine Bezzaz (born 1981), Algerian football midfielder
Yacine Brahimi (born 1990), French football player of Algerian descent
El Yacine Derradj (born 1980), Algerian footballer
Yacine Diallo (born 1897), politician from Guinea who served in the French National Assembly from 1946 to 1954
Yacine Douma (born 1973), French judoka
Yacine Elghorri, animator, illustrator, storyboard artist, conceptual designer and comic book artist
Yacine Haddou (born 1989), French professional football player
Yacine Hima (born 1984), Algerian footballer
Yacine Kechout (born 1982), Algerian football player
Khady Yacine Ngom (born 1979), female Senegalese basketball player
Yacine Qasmi (born 1991), French-born Moroccan football player
Yacine Si Salem (born 1988), French-Algerian football player
Yacine Slatni (born 1973), retired Algerian professional footballer

Surname
Kateb Yacine (1929–1989), Algerian writer of novels and plays and advocate of the Algerian Berber cause

See also 
Medina Yacine Ba, village in Senegal
 Yasin
 Yassin
 Yassine
 Yaseen

References

Arabic-language surnames
Arabic masculine given names
French-language surnames
French masculine given names